Rome 1585, also known as The Mercenaries, is a 1961 Italian epic adventure film co-written and directed  by Mario Bonnard and starring Daniela Rocca and Antonio Cifariello. It is Bonnard's last film.

Plot

Cast 
 
Daniela Rocca as Alba di Porto Reale
Antonio Cifariello as  Captain  Mellina
  Salvo Randone as Pope Sixtus V
 Folco Lulli as Fra Silenzio
 Debra Paget as Esmeralda
 Yvonne Sanson as Olimpia Gonzales 		
 Livio Lorenzon as Duke of Bolsena	
 Giulio Donnini 
 Gianni Solaro 
 Nerio Bernardi  
 Mino Doro

References

External links

  
1960s historical adventure films
Italian historical adventure films
Italian swashbuckler films    
Films directed by Mario Bonnard
Films set in the 1580s
Films set in Rome
1960 films
1960s Italian-language films
1960s Italian films